Amos Van Pelt (born c. 1948) was a Canadian football player who played for the Ottawa Rough Riders and Winnipeg Blue Bombers. He played college football at Ball State University.

References

1940s births
Living people
American football halfbacks
Canadian football running backs
American players of Canadian football
Ball State Cardinals football players
Winnipeg Blue Bombers players